Blue Bus may refer to the following bus companies:

In the United Kingdom
Blue Bus and Coach Services, serving Greater Manchester, Lancashire and Merseyside
Blue Bus of Penwortham, Lancashire
Blue Bus of North Lanarkshire, also known as Blue Bus of Shotts
Blue Bus Services, or Tailby & George, in Willington, Derbyshire
Blue Bus Services, an operating division of Busways, Tyne and Wear

In North America
West Vancouver Blue Bus, or West Vancouver Municipal Transit, Canada
Blue Bus lines, in Portland, Oregon, U.S.
Big Blue Bus, in Santa Monica and western Los Angeles, California, U.S.